The Union Pacific Railroad Julesburg Depot, at 210 W. First St. in Julesburg, Colorado, and also known as the Depot Museum, was built in 1930.  It is listed on the National Register of Historic Places.

It is a brick, one-story building built as a standard Union Pacific Railroad "combination-type" depot, i.e. handling passengers as well as freight and express shipments.

The depot was hit by a tornado on June 6, 1947, that badly damaged the building;  it was repaired.  In 1974 it was moved a short distance and turned into a museum.

It was listed on the National Register in 2004.  It was deemed significant for its role in transportation and the economic growth of Julesburg, and architecturally for its design, materials, and workmanship which are preserved despite the building having been moved a short distance.

References

Railway stations on the National Register of Historic Places in Colorado
Railway stations in the United States opened in 1930
National Register of Historic Places in Sedgwick County, Colorado
1930 establishments in Colorado
Former Union Pacific Railroad stations in Colorado
Buildings and structures in Sedgwick County, Colorado